Jazlyn Asia Santos Moya (born 24 January 1997), known as Jazlyn Moya, is an American-born Peruvian–Dominican footballer who plays as a forward for Australian club Logan Lightning FC and the Dominican Republic women's national team.

Early life
Moya was born in New Brunswick, New Jersey to a Dominican father and a Peruvian mother. She was raised in Avenel, New Jersey.

High school and college career
Moya has attended the Colonia High School in Colonia, New Jersey and the Monmouth University in West Long Branch, New Jersey.

Club career
Moya has played for New Jersey Copa FC in the United Women's Soccer.

International career
Moya attended a training camp of the senior Peru women's national team in March 2019. She made her senior debut for the Dominican Republic on 7 July 2021.

References

External links

1997 births
Living people
Citizens of the Dominican Republic through descent
Colonia High School alumni
Dominican Republic women's footballers
Women's association football forwards
Dominican Republic women's international footballers
Dominican Republic expatriate women's footballers
Dominican Republic expatriate sportspeople in Australia
Expatriate women's soccer players in Australia
Dominican Republic people of Peruvian descent
Citizens of Peru through descent
Peruvian women's footballers
Peruvian people of Dominican Republic descent
Sportspeople from New Brunswick, New Jersey
Soccer players from New York (state)
People from Woodbridge Township, New Jersey
Sportspeople from Middlesex County, New Jersey
American women's soccer players
Monmouth Hawks women's soccer players
American expatriate women's soccer players
American expatriate sportspeople in Australia
American sportspeople of Dominican Republic descent
American sportspeople of Peruvian descent
21st-century American women